The Jumpman Invitational presented by Novant Health is a college basketball event featuring the men's and women's basketball teams that began in 2022 and is played at Spectrum Center in Charlotte, North Carolina. The event is owned and operated by the Charlotte Sports Foundation and ESPN Events.

History
Four teams are participating – Florida, Michigan, North Carolina and Oklahoma. Each team plays one game each year, as a double-header.

Game results

Men's

Women's

Team records

References

Basketball competitions in the United States
2022 in basketball
2022 in American sports
Recurring events established in 2022